Mewar Kumar Jamatia is an Indian politician belonging to the Indigenous People's Front of Tripura (IPFT). He is the general secretary of IPFT, a political party that was created to demand a separate state for indigenous Tripuri people. He is current minister of tribal welfare and forest of BJP-IPFT Government, and represents the Ashrambari vidhansabha assembly. In 2018, he defeated Aghore Debbarma to win the Legislative Assembly election.

References 

Tripura politicians
Year of birth missing (living people)
Living people